4-Methylbuphedrone (also known as 4-MeMABP, BZ-6378 and 4-Methyl-α-methylamino-butyrophenone), is a stimulant drug of the cathinone class that has been sold online as a designer drug.

It was first reported to the EMCDDA in November 2011.

Legal status 
4-Methylbuphedrone is listed in Anlage I and therefore illegal in Germany.

As of October 2015 4-MeMABP is a controlled substance in China.

In the United States 4-Methylbuphedrone is considered a schedule 1 controlled substance as a positional isomer of 4-Methylethcathinone (4-MEC)

See also 
 4-Methylcathinone
 4-Methylethcathinone
 4-Methylmethcathinone
 4-Methylpentedrone
 Buphedrone

References 

Cathinones
Designer drugs
Norepinephrine-dopamine releasing agents